Impact Exciter is the eighth studio album by Japanese voice actress and pop singer Nana Mizuki. It was released on July 7, 2010 in Japan in two editions: a CD only edition and a limited CD+DVD edition. The limited edition includes a special box, a 77-minute DVD and a 48-page hardback photobook. This also became Mizuki's first foreign released album because of the cooperation between King Records and Gold Typhoon Music in Taiwan. The Taiwanese edition was released on 29 October 2010.

Track listing
Time to Impact Exciter
Composition, arrangement: Noriyasu Agematsu (Elements Garden)
Next Arcadia
Lyrics: Hibiki
Composition, arrangement: Noriyasu Agematsu (Elements Garden)

Lyrics, composition: Shihori
Arrangement: Masato Nakayama (Elements Garden)
Ending theme for TBS TV program Ha!Ha!Ha! Bakusho Mondai in June and July
Silent Bible
Lyrics: Nana Mizuki
Composition: Haruki Mori (Elements Garden)
Arrangement: Daisuke Kikuta (Elements Garden)
Opening theme for PlayStation Portable game Magical Girl Lyrical Nanoha A's Portable: The Battle of Aces
Young Alive!
Lyrics: Nana Mizuki
Composition: Miyake Hirobumi
Arrangement: Junpei Fujita (Elements Garden)
Scoop Scope
Lyrics: Yūmao
Composition, arrangement: Shinya Saitō
Dragonia
Lyrics: Hibiki
Composition: Shunryuu
Arrangement: Junpei Fujita (Elements Garden)
 
Lyrics: Nana Mizuki
Composition: Agematsu Noriyasu (Elements Garden)
Arrangement: Junpei Fujita (Elements Garden)
Second opening theme for anime television series White Album

Lyrics: Fujibayashi Shouko
Composition, arrangement: Saito Yuya

Lyrics: Metal Gear Solid Peace Walker sound team
Composition: Akihiro Honda
Arrangement: Daisuke Kikuta (Elements Garden)
Phantom Minds
Lyrics: Nana Mizuki
Composition: Eriko Yoshiki
Arrangement: Jun Suyama
Opening theme for anime film Magical Girl Lyrical Nanoha The Movie 1st

Lyrics: Sayuri Katayama
Composition, arrangement: Shogo Ohnishi
Ending theme for 

Lyrics: Gorō Matsui
Composition, arrangement: Junpei Fujita (Elements Garden)

Lyrics, composition: Nana Mizuki
Arrangement: Hitoshi Fujima (Elements Garden)
Don't be long
Lyrics, composition, arrangement: Toshirō Yabuki
Insert song for anime film Magical Girl Lyrical Nanoha The Movie 1st

Lyrics: Nana Mizuki
Composition: Mika Agematsu
Arrangement: Hitoshi Fujima (Elements Garden)

Limited DVD Mizuki Academy track list
 [Lesson 1: English] Nana in London - Ultimate Diamond Shooting Movie (with English subtitle)
 [Lesson 2: Gymnastics] Ehime Mandarin Pirates First Pitch Ceremony
 [Lesson 3: Society] Minetopia Besshi Social Studies Field Trip
 [Lesson 4: Science] National Museum of Emerging Science and Innovation Science Field Trip
 [Lesson 5: Home Economics] Teacher Nana's Chasse Recipe
 [Lesson 6: Dance] Choreography Music Video "Koi no Yokushiryoku -type EXCITER-"
 [Lesson 7: Japanese] Lyrics Commentary and Music Video "July 7"

Charts

Oricon Sales Chart (Japan)

References

2010 albums
Nana Mizuki albums